A by-election was held for the New South Wales Legislative Assembly electorate of Lismore on 11 March 1933 because of the death of William Missingham, . William Frith of the National Party of Australia – NSW won the election with 33.4% of the vote.

Dates

Result

William Missingham,  died.

See also
Electoral results for the district of Lismore
List of New South Wales state by-elections

References

New South Wales state by-elections
1933 elections in Australia
1930s in New South Wales